Madeleine Frieden-Kinnen (4 October 1915 – 8 February 1999) was a Luxembourgian politician.

She was the first woman in Luxembourg to become a member of the government. On 3 January 1967, after a government reshuffle, she was appointed State Secretary for Families, Social Solidarity, Youth, Population, Education, and Culture in the Werner-Cravatte Ministry. On 2 February 1969 she became Minister for Families, Youth, Social Solidarity, Health, and Culture in the second Werner-Schaus government.

In 1972, she was forced to resign following a public scandal, and withdrew from public life.

She was married to the minister Pierre Frieden.

References

1915 births
1999 deaths
20th-century Luxembourgian women politicians
Women government ministers of Luxembourg